New Castle Branch refers to the following rail lines:
Erie Railroad lines:
New Castle Branch (Erie Railroad), Sharon to New Castle, Pennsylvania
Pennsylvania Railroad lines:
New Castle Cut-off, Wilmington to New Castle, Delaware
New Castle Branch (Pennsylvania Railroad), New Castle to Stoneboro, Pennsylvania